This is a list of listed buildings in Edinburgh. The list is split out by parish.

Edinburgh is said to have the largest number of listed buildings of any city in the world.

 List of Category A listed buildings in Edinburgh

Comprehensive lists of Category A, B and C buildings:

 List of listed buildings in Currie, Edinburgh
 List of listed buildings in Edinburgh/1
 List of listed buildings in Edinburgh/2
 List of listed buildings in Edinburgh/3
 List of listed buildings in Edinburgh/4
 List of listed buildings in Edinburgh/5
 List of listed buildings in Edinburgh/6
 List of listed buildings in Edinburgh/7
 List of listed buildings in Edinburgh/8
 List of listed buildings in Edinburgh/9
 List of listed buildings in Edinburgh/10
 List of listed buildings in Edinburgh/11
 List of listed buildings in Edinburgh/12
 List of listed buildings in Edinburgh/13
 List of listed buildings in Edinburgh/14
 List of listed buildings in Edinburgh/15
 List of listed buildings in Edinburgh/16
 List of listed buildings in Edinburgh/17
 List of listed buildings in Edinburgh/18
 List of listed buildings in Edinburgh/19
 List of listed buildings in Edinburgh/20
 List of listed buildings in Edinburgh/21
 List of listed buildings in Edinburgh/22
 List of listed buildings in Edinburgh/23
 List of listed buildings in Edinburgh/24
 List of listed buildings in Edinburgh/25
 List of listed buildings in Edinburgh/26
 List of listed buildings in Edinburgh/27
 List of listed buildings in Edinburgh/28
 List of listed buildings in Edinburgh/29
 List of listed buildings in Edinburgh/30
 List of listed buildings in Edinburgh/31
 List of listed buildings in Edinburgh/32
 List of listed buildings in Edinburgh/33

References

External links

Edinburgh’s Post-War Listed Buildings, historic-scotland.gov.uk

Edinburgh